Mizanur Rahman is a male Islamic given name, meaning "balance of the Most Merciful". It may refer to:

Mijanur Rahman (born 1958), Bangladeshi academic
Mijanur Rahman Khan,  a Major general in the Bangladesh Army
Mizanur Rahman (cricketer) Bangladeshi cricketer
Mizanur Rahman (Islamic activist) (born 1983), British Islamic activist who was convicted of solicitation to murder
Mizanur Rahman Chowdhury (1928-2006), Bangladeshi politician and former Prime Minister of Bangladesh
Mizanur Rahman Sayed (born 1963), Bangladeshi Islamic scholar
Mohammad Mizanur Rahman (born 1957), Bangladeshi politician from Khulna
Md Mizanur Rahman (born 1978), Bangladeshi kabaddi player
Sufi Mohammed Mizanur Rahman, Bangladeshi industrialist

Arabic masculine given names